Garzelli is an Italian surname. Notable people with the surname include:

Enrico Garzelli (1909–1992), Italian rower
Stefano Garzelli (born 1973), Italian cyclist

See also
Garelli (disambiguation)

Italian-language surnames